Gian Francesco Giudice (born January 25, 1961) is an Italian theoretical physicist working at CERN in particle physics and cosmology.

Academic career
After graduating in physics from the University of Padua in 1984, Giudice obtained in 1988 his PhD in theoretical physics from the International School for Advanced Studies in Trieste. Between 1988 and 1990 he was Research Associate at the Fermi National Accelerator Laboratory near Chicago. Between 1990 and 1992 he was Research Fellow in the Physics Department of the University of Texas at Austin, in the group led by Steven Weinberg. After being employed by the Istituto Nazionale di Fisica Nucleare of Italy, in 1993 he moved to CERN, where he is currently the Head of the Theoretical Physics Department. Academician of the Istituto Veneto di Scienze, Lettere ed Arti and of Accademia Galileiana, he has been awarded the 2013 Jacques Solvay Chair in Physics.

Research
The research activity of Giudice mainly deals with the formulation of new theories that extend our present knowledge of the particle world toward even smaller distances. He is also studying how these theories can be applied to cosmology in order to describe the early stages of the history of our universe. His most notable results are in the areas of supersymmetry, extra dimensions, electroweak physics, collider physics, dark matter, and leptogenesis. Together with physicist Riccardo Barbieri, he proposed a widely used criterion to test the degree of naturalness of a supersymmetric theory that achieves electroweak symmetry breaking. He co-invented the Giudice-Masiero mechanism, which is the leading explanation for the Mu problem of supergravity. He has made fundamental contributions to the construction of Gauge Mediation, and he is a co-author of the first papers proposing Anomaly Mediation and Split Supersymmetry. He is one of the proponents of a method to compute quantum effects in theories with broken supersymmetry through analytic continuation into superspace. Well known and much used in LHC studies is his method to describe graviton interactions in theories with extra spatial dimensions. He is also one of the originators of the idea of Minimal Flavor Violation, a paradigm to characterize the effects of flavor transitions in new theories of particle physics. After the discovery of the Higgs boson, he computed the probability that the Higgs vacuum undergoes quantum tunnelling, finding the surprising result that the universe is in a critical state which will eventually end in a cosmic collapse.

Support of particle accelerator projects
Giudice has played an active role in studying the physics potential of particle accelerators, supporting and advocating several new projects at CERN and in other laboratories worldwide. He has coordinated study groups for LEP, Tevatron, the Neutrino Factory, LHC, CLIC, SuperB and has participated in the committee reviewing the safety of collisions at the LHC. He is a member of the LHC Experiments Committee (LHCC ), the body that reviews the activity of the experimental groups at the LHC, and of the European Committee for Future Accelerators (ECFA), the advisory body for long-range planning of high-energy facilities in Europe.

Science popularization
Besides his research work, Giudice is active in popularization of science and outreach, often giving public lectures on particle physics and related topics, and participating in science festivals and other events. He is the author of A Zeptospace Odyssey, a popular-science book on the physics of the LHC, which has been finalist for the 2012 Galileo Literary Prize for popular science and the Prize Pianeta Galileo 2013. The book, originally written in English, has been translated into Italian, German, French, Spanish, and Korean.

References

External links
 Scientific publications of G. F. Giudice on INSPIRE-HEP
 A Zeptospace Odyssey website
 TED talk
 Interview at Origins 2013
 2012 Isaac Asimov Memorial Debate
 2014 Pauli Lecture on the Higgs Boson
 

1961 births
People associated with CERN
20th-century Italian physicists
Living people
Particle physicists
Scientists from Padua
Theoretical physicists
University of Padua alumni
People associated with Fermilab
21st-century Italian physicists